Charles Nolan "Bud" Hulsey (born May 30, 1949) is the State Representative for the Tennessee House of Representatives 2nd District in Sullivan County.

Early life
Bud Hulsey was born on May 30, 1949, and he attended Durango High School as a Durango Demon from 1964 to his 1967 graduation. Hulsey later attended Bob Jones University at Greenville, South Carolina from 1967 to 1972 where was a member of the "Byran" (William Jennings Bryan Literary Society at Bob Jones University) men's society and where he also obtained his Bachelor of Arts (B.A.) degree in education.

Career
Bud Hulsey is a retired Kingsport Police lieutenant with post graduate work at the University of Virginia via FBI National Academy.

He is the owner and President of Burlington Logistics, Inc., a trucking company located in the Tri-Cities area of East Tennessee.

Hulsey was elected to the Tennessee House of Representatives as a member of the 109th General Assembly in 2014 after defeating three-term incumbent Tony Shipley in the Republican Primaries and Independent J.R. Enfield in the general election. He was again elected to serve in the 110th General Assembly in 2016 after a landslide victory over Democratic challenger J.S. Moore. On November 6, 2018, Hulsey was re-elected to serve in the 111th General Assembly after defeating Democratic challenger Arvil Love, Jr. and Independent challenger Robert Ellis in the General Election. The second district proved its loyalty to Hulsey yet again on November 3, 2020, when they overwhelmingly supported him against repeat challenger Arvil Love, Jr. in the general election.

During the COVID-19 pandemic, he proposed legislation to prohibit mandatory COVID-19 vaccination. As of July 2022, over 26,000 Tennesseans have died of Covid-19.

Committee assignments

Hulsey serves in the 112th General Assembly as:
Chair, Corrections Subcommittee
Member, Agriculture and National Resources Committee
Member, Agriculture and National Resources Subcommittee
Member, Criminal Justice Subcommittee
Member, State Government Committee

Hulsey served in the 111th General Assembly as:
Chair, Corrections Subcommittee
Member, State Committee
Member, Agriculture and National Resources Committee
Member, Agriculture and National Resources Subcommittee
Member, Judiciary Committee
Member, Public Safety Committee of Extraordinary Session II

Hulsey served in the 110th General Assembly as:
Vice-chair, House State Government Committee
Member, House Agriculture and Natural Resources Committee
Member, House State Government Committee

Hulsey served in the 109th General Assembly as:
Member, House Agriculture and Natural Resources Committee
Member, House State Government Committee
Member, House State Government Subcommittee

Other

In July 2014, Hulsey lost his campaign chair, former Tennessee State Representative Michael Locke, in a hit and run incident by a drunk driver.

References

Republican Party members of the Tennessee House of Representatives
1949 births
Living people
American Protestants
Bob Jones University alumni
21st-century American politicians